Thiruvallam Sree Parasurama Swami Temple is one of the most ancient temples of South India. It is situated on the banks of Karamana River near Thiruvallam, Thiruvananthapuram. It is the only temple in Kerala dedicated to Lord Parasurama. The temple is 6 km from Kovalam Beach and  5 km from Trivandrum International Airport and  3 km from Thiruvananthapuram.3 km from Attukal Temple 2 km from Pazhanchira Devi Temple and 1 km from Sree Alukadu Devi temple. This heritage structure is placed under the list of monuments of national importance. From Eastfort Bus stand frequently Kerala state Road Transport Corporation buses are frequently plying towards the temple.

The head of Padmanabhaswamy was seen in this temple and the feet at Tripadapuram Mahadeva temple. The body of the swami is seen in the Ananthapadmanabhaswamy temple. These 3 temples are visited in one go.

History
It says that the temple was built during the 12th and 13th century, late Pandyan period. The temple is considered a protected monument by the Archaeology Department of Kerala. It is famous for Balitharpanam (a tribute to ancestors). Legend has it that Lord Parasurama is the creator of Kerala and the temple dedicated to him is considered as a holy place for his devotees. During the karkidaka vavu day (a holiday in the Malayalam month of karkidakam) as part of the bali (a religious ritual), devotees pay homage to the departed souls of forefathers, after taking a dip in the holy water.

References

Hindu temples in Thiruvananthapuram district
Archaeological sites in Kerala
Vishnu temples